Thiane is a heterocyclic compound and an organosulfur compound with the formula (CH2)5S.  It is a saturated six-membered ring with five carbon atoms and one sulfur atom.  The compound is a colorless liquid. It can be prepared by the reaction of 1,5-dibromopentane with sodium sulfide:

Br-(CH2)5-Br + Na2S → (CH2)5S + 2NaBr

References

Sulfur heterocycles
Six-membered rings